The 2017 Unibet European Championship was the tenth edition of the Professional Darts Corporation tournament, the European Championship, which saw the top players from the twelve European tour events compete against each other. The tournament took place from 26–29 October 2017 at the Ethias Arena in Hasselt, Belgium.

Michael van Gerwen was the three-time defending champion, having beaten Mensur Suljović 11–1 in the final of the 2016 tournament, and he retained once again to capture his fourth title, by defeating Rob Cross 11–7 in the final. 

Notably, Kyle Anderson hit a nine-dart finish in his semi-final defeat to van Gerwen, in which he also missed two match darts to win the match himself.

Former World champions Phil Taylor, Gary Anderson, Raymond van Barneveld and Adrian Lewis were notable absences at the tournament after taking part in none or too few European Tour events to qualify.

Prize money 
The 2017 European Championship will have a total prize fund of £400,000, equal the amount of the last staging of the tournament. The following is the breakdown of the fund:

Qualification 
The 2017 tournament continues the new system in terms of qualification of the 2016 edition: The top 32 players from the European Tour Order of Merit, which is solely based on prize money won in the twelve European tour events during the season, qualifying for the tournament.

New regulations affected the prize money counting for seeds at all European Tour Events: If a seeded player loses in the second round (seeds enter already at second stage of the events), they still receive the full prize money payment, but their prize money will not count towards any Orders of Merit.

The following players will take part in the tournament, with the top 8 players being seeds:

Draw

References 

European Championship (darts)
European Championship
European Championship
Sport in Hasselt
October 2017 sports events in Europe